C. schroederi may refer to:
 Calliostoma schroederi, a sea snail species
 Cerodrillia schroederi, a sea snail species
 Cricosaurus schroederi, an extinct marine crocodyliform species